David William Bald Eagle (April 8, 1919 – July 22, 2016), also known as Chief David Beautiful Bald Eagle, was a Lakota actor, soldier, stuntman, and musician.

Life and work
Dave Bald Eagle was born in a tipi on the west banks of Cherry Creek, on the Cheyenne River Sioux Tribe Reservation in South Dakota.

Bald Eagle first enlisted in the Fourth Cavalry of the United States Army and served out his enlistment. During World War II, he re-enlisted in the 82nd Airborne Division ("All American Division") where he fought in the Battle of Anzio, being awarded a Silver Star, and in the D-Day invasion of Normandy at which time he received a Purple Heart Medal when he was wounded.

After the Second World War, Bald Eagle worked in a number of occupations including drummer, race car driver, semi-pro baseball player, and rodeo performer before beginning a career in Hollywood films. He was the grandson of famous Lakota warrior White Bull.

Selected filmography
Dances with Wolves (1990) as technical advisor and extra
Lakota Woman: Siege at Wounded Knee (1994) as Old man at HQ
Skins (2002) as Old Soldier
Into the West (2005) episode "Wheel to the Stars" as Two Arrows
Imprint (2007) as Medicine Man
Rich Hall's Inventing the Indian (2012) (TV Movie documentary) as himself
River of Fundament (2014) as Norman III
Neither Wolf Nor Dog (2016) as Dan

References

External links

State Of South Dakota House Commemoration Bill 1011

1919 births
2016 deaths
20th-century American male actors
20th-century Native Americans
Male actors from South Dakota
Musicians from South Dakota
Native American United States military personnel
Native American male actors
Native American musicians
United States Army personnel of World War II
United States Army non-commissioned officers